Lucy Payne (born 4 February 1992) is an English female kickboxer and muay thai fighter based in Cornwall. She is a former WBC Muaythai World Featherweight champion and is the #2 featherweight in the world by WBC Muaythai, as of April 2020.

Titles
2015 – World Boxing Council Muaythai
2014 – GBMA Muay Thai Golden Belt Title, 57 kg
2013 – Awakening Muay Thai 57 kg World Champion (1 Defense)
2012 – KORE MMA Bantamweight Muay Thai Champion
2012 – ISKA K1 European Title Contender
2011 – International Kickboxing Federation (IKF) British Champion
2010 – UKMF British Muay Thai Champion
2010 – ISKA English Champion
2010 – International Kickboxing Federation (IKF) English Featherweight Muay Thai Champion
2009 – Southwest Area Champion
2009 – Ringmasters Tournament Champion
2009 – IFMA European Muay Thai Championships

Kickboxing record

|-
|-  bgcolor="FFBBBB”
|  
| Loss 
|align=left| Niamh Kinehan 
| Yokkao 38 
|align=left| Bolton, England
| Decision  
| 5 
| 2:00 
| 
|-
|-  bgcolor="FFBBBB"
|  
| Loss 
|align=left| Chommanee Sor Taehiran 
| World Muay Thai Angels Tournament 2,  Quarter-Finals 
|align=left| Bangkok, Thailand
| Decision  
| 5 
| 2:00 
| 
|-
|-  bgcolor="CCFFCC"
|  
| Win 
|align=left| Fani Peloumpi 
| World Muay Thai Angels Tournament 2,  First Round 
|align=left| Bangkok, Thailand
| Decision  
| 5 
| 2:00 
| 
|-
|-  bgcolor="CCFFCC"
|  
| Win 
|align=left| Gentiane Lupi 
| Rebellion Muay Thai XIII 
|align=left| Melbourne, Australia
| Decision (Unanimous) 
| 5 
| 2:00 
| 
|-
|-  bgcolor="CCFFCC"
|  
| Win 
|align=left| Leonie Macks 
| Siam Pro Muay Thai Show, Tournament Final 
|align=left| Clontarf, Australia
| Decision (Unanimous) 
| 5 
| 3:00 
| 
|-
! style=background:white colspan=9 |
|-  bgcolor="CCFFCC"
|  
| Win 
|align=left| Melina Yung 
| Siam Pro Muay Thai Show, Tournament Semi-Finals 
|align=left| Clontarf, Australia
| Decision (Unanimous) 
| 5 
| 2:00 
| 
|-
|-  bgcolor="CCFFCC"
|  
| Win 
|align=left| Sam Brown 
| Yokkao Next Generation 
|align=left| Melbourne, Australia
| TKO (Knees) 
| 3 
| 
| 
|-
|-  bgcolor="FFBBBB"
|  
| Loss 
|align=left| Leonie Macks 
| Siam 2 Sydney Promotions 
|align=left| Sydney, Australia
| Decision 
| 5 
| 2:00 
| 
|-
|-  bgcolor="CCFFCC"
|  
| Win 
|align=left| Leonie Macks 
| Siam 2 Sydney Promotions 
|align=left| Sydney, Australia
| Decision 
| 5 
| 2:00 
| 
|-
|-  bgcolor="CCFFCC"
|  
| Win 
|align=left| Chajmaa Bellakhal 
| Smash 11 
|align=left| Leeds, England
| TKO (Retirement)  
| 2 
| 3:00 
| 
|-
! style=background:white colspan=9 |
|-
|-  bgcolor="CCFFCC"
|  
| Win 
|align=left| Tanya Merret 
| Fight Night Cardiff 
|align=left| Cardiff, Wales
| TKO (Body Kick)  
| 1 
| 
| 
|-
|-  bgcolor="FFBBBB"
|  
| Loss 
|align=left| Tiffany van Soest 
| Lion Fight 15 
|align=left|  Mashantucket, Connecticut, United States
| Decision (Unanimous) 
| 5 
| 3:00 
| 
|-
|-  bgcolor="CCFFCC"
|  
| Win 
|align=left| Victoria Lomax 
| Judgement Day 2 
|align=left|  Cornwall, England
| TKO 
| 2 
| 
| 
|-
! style=background:white colspan=9 |
|-  bgcolor="FFBBBB"
|  
| Loss 
|align=left| Tiffany van Soest 
| Lion Fight 10 
|align=left|  Las Vegas, Nevada, United States
| TKO (elbows) 
| 1 
| 2:50 
| 
|-
! style=background:white colspan=9 |
|-  bgcolor="CCFFCC"
|  
| Win 
|align=left| Tanya Merret 
| Fast & Furious 2 
|align=left| Cornwall, England
| Decision (Unanimous)  
| 5 
| 3:00 
| 
|-
! style=background:white colspan=9 |
|-  bgcolor="FFBBBB"
|  
| Loss 
|align=left| Sandra Sevilla 
| Best of Siam III 
|align=left| Paris, France
| Decision (Split)  
| 3 
| 3:00 
| 
|-
|-  bgcolor="FFBBBB"
|  
| Loss 
|align=left| Denise Kielholtz 
|Enfusion 3: Trial of the Gladiators, Final 
|align=left| Ljubljana, Slovenia
| Decision (Majority)  
| 3 
| 3:00 
| 
|-
! style=background:white colspan=9 |
|-
|-  bgcolor="CCFFCC"
|  
| Win 
|align=left| Chajmaa Bellakhal 
| Enfusion 3: Trial of the Gladiators, Semi Finals 
|align=left|  Ljubljana, Slovenia
| Decision 
| 3 
| 3:00 
| 
|-
|-  bgcolor="FFBBBB"
|  
| Loss 
|align=left| Bonny van Oortmerssen 
| Pure Force 13: Domination 
|align=left|  England
| Decision (Unanimous) 
| 5 
| 3:00 
| 
|-
! style=background:white colspan=9 |
|-  bgcolor="CCFFCC"
|  
| Win 
|align=left| Meryem Uslu 
| KORE MMA 
|align=left|  Cornwall, England
| Decision (Unanimous) 
| 5 
| 3:00 
| 
|-
! style=background:white colspan=9 |
|-  bgcolor="CCFFCC"
|  
| Win 
|align=left| Claudia Celdar 
| Danger Zone 
|align=left|  Cornwall, England
| Points 
| 5 
| 2:00 
| 
|-
|-  bgcolor="CCFFCC"
|  
| Win 
|align=left| Gemma Wilcox 
| Fast & Furious 
|align=left|  Cornwall, England
| Decision (Unanimous) 
| 5 
| 2:00 
| 
|-
! style=background:white colspan=9 |
|-  bgcolor="FFBBBB"
|  
| Loss 
|align=left| Alexis Rufus 
| Muay Thai Addicts II 
|align=left|  London, England
| Decision 
| 5 
| 2:00 
| 
|-
! style=background:white colspan=9 |
|-  bgcolor="CCFFCC"
|  
| Win 
|align=left| Claudia Celdar 
| Judgement Day 1 
|align=left|  Cornwall, England
| Points 
| 5 
| 2:00 
| 
|-
! style=background:white colspan=9 |
|-  bgcolor="FFBBBB"
|  
| Loss 
|align=left| Amanda Kelly 
| Muay Thai event in England 
|align=left|  
| Points 
| 3 
| 3:00 
| 
|-
|-  bgcolor="CCFFCC"
|  
| Win 
|align=left| Sarah McCarthy 
| IMA England Eliminations 
|align=left|  Cornwall, England
| Decision (Unanimous) 
| 5 
| 2:00 
| 
|-
|-  bgcolor="CCFFCC"
|  
| Win 
|align=left| Deborah Heatrick 
| Muay Thai event in England 
|align=left|  Cambridge, England
| Decision (Unanimous) 
| 3 
| 3:00 
| 
|-
|-
| colspan=9 | Legend:

See also
 List of female kickboxers

References

External links
 Facebook athlete page
 Lucy Payne at Awakening Fighters

1992 births
English female kickboxers
Living people
Featherweight kickboxers
Female Muay Thai practitioners
English Muay Thai practitioners
Sportspeople from Penzance